The Haba River Shankou Dam (Haba River Shankou Hydroelectric Station)  is a concrete-face rock-fill dam on the Haba River, a tributary of the Irtysh. It is located in Habahe County of the Xinjiang Uyghur Autonomous Region in China. The primary purpose of the dam is hydroelectric power generation, flood control and water supply for civil and irrigation use. It supports a 25.2 MW power station.

The dam is located about 15 km north (upstream) of the Habahe county seat. It is the last, in the upstream-to-downstream order, of the Haba River cascade, which eventually will contain 4 dams.

On 13 January 1997 the power station was operational and the entire project to include the irrigation works was complete in September 1998.

The dam's reservoir holds 50 million cubic meters of water.

Trivia
The word Shankou, which means "mountain pass", when written in Chinese characters (山口), the same as the Japanese word with the reading "Yamaguchi". Japan has several Yamaguchi Dams of its own.

See also

Jilebulake Dam – upstream
List of dams and reservoirs in China
List of tallest dams in the world

References

Dams in China
Dams completed in 1996
Hydroelectric power stations in Xinjiang
Energy infrastructure completed in 1997
Concrete-face rock-fill dams
RHaba River Shankou